Muse Air was a domestic U.S. airline founded in 1981, headquartered near Dallas Love Field in Dallas, Texas, later moving to William P. Hobby Airport in Houston. Southwest Airlines acquired Muse Air in 1985 and later renamed it TranStar Airlines, but it was unprofitable, and was shut down in 1987.

History

The company was first established as a Texas-based intrastate airline  named Muse Air for its founder, but much like Southwest Airlines, it only operated larger mainline jet aircraft and began to initiate new service to destinations outside of the state of Texas. Muse Air's name originates from its founder and the one time president of Southwest Airlines, Marion Lamar Muse.  The airline's first flights consisted of nonstop service between Dallas Love Field (DAL) and Houston Hobby Airport (HOU) in 1981 with two McDonnell Douglas MD-80 aircraft. An air traffic controller's strike almost immediately made things difficult for the company, and Muse stepped down as CEO to let his son Michael take over the company. By the end of 1984 the company was still struggling, and actively looking for a merger to keep it afloat. At the end of the year, Harold Simmons, president of the Amalgamated Sugar Company offered the airline the money to continue, on the condition that Michael Muse resign, and that his father return as CEO. Despite the new influx of cash and Lamar Muse in charge again, the company was not able to generate a consistent profit despite its use of non-union labor and competitive fares.  Besides MD-80 jetliners, the airline added McDonnell Douglas DC-9-30 and DC-9-50 aircraft to its fleet.  During its existence, Muse Air attempted to operate new nonstop routes with jet aircraft that were not being flown by other airlines at the time, including Austin (AUS) - Los Angeles (LAX), Lubbock (LBB) - Los Angeles (LAX), Midland/Odessa (MAF) - Los Angeles (LAX), Houston Hobby (HOU) - Ontario (ONT) and Midland/Odessa (MAF) - Las Vegas (LAS).

Muse Air alliance with AirCal
In 1984, Muse Air entered into an alliance with California-based AirCal (formerly known as Air California) with connections being listed in its April 29, 1984 system timetable via Los Angeles (LAX) to and from AirCal flights serving Oakland, California (OAK), Portland, Oregon (PDX), Reno, Nevada (RNO), Sacramento (SMF), San Francisco (SFO), and San Jose, California (SJC) and Seattle, Washington (SEA).  The January 1, 1984 AirCal system timetable listed connections via Los Angeles (LAX) and Ontario (ONT) to and from Muse Air flights serving Austin (AUS), Houston Hobby (HOU), Midland/Odessa (MAF) and New Orleans (MSY).

No smoking policy
Muse Air prohibited smoking on their flights long before the U.S. government implemented federal restrictions concerning smoking on board scheduled commercial airline flights. The intent was to not tarnish the airline's brand new MD-80 aircraft. For four years, Muse Air had prohibited smoking on its flights however in 1985 the smoking ban was rescinded.

Acquisition by Southwest Airlines and name change to TranStar
On June 25, 1985, Southwest Airlines acquired Muse Air, and Muse Air was allowed to continue to operate as a separate airline. In February 1986 its name was changed to "TranStar Airlines." Lamar Muse was removed from having any active role in management, and the company was restructured. McDonnell Douglas MD-80 and DC-9-50 jetliners continued to be operated and the airline's routes were modified to provide flights between California/Nevada and Florida via Texas and Louisiana, primarily via Houston Hobby Airport and New Orleans.  These flights were restricted from carrying mail, air freight, and any interline passengers traveling partly on other airlines. TranStar also introduced new nonstop flights such as Houston Hobby (HOU) - San Francisco (SFO), Las Vegas (LAS) - San Francisco (SFO), Los Angeles (LAX) - San Francisco (SFO), Houston Hobby (HOU) - Miami (MIA), New Orleans (MSY) - Los Angeles (LAX), New Orleans (MSY) - Las Vegas (LAS), New Orleans (MSY) - Miami (MIA) and New Orleans (MSY) - San Antonio (SAT).  Among other changes were a new corporate image, replacing Muse Air's beige aircraft livery and color scheme branding, with a dark blue tone, accentuated by concentric multi-hued pinstripes banding the fuselage. Attempts were made to integrate the TranStar pilots with Southwest Airlines pilots, but in a classic example of misapplied BATNA an integrated seniority list was rejected by the TranStar pilot's association.  At its peak, TranStar employed some 900 people and served 14 cities, but by mid-1987 the company was still not making a profit and the airline was shut down.

TranStar SkyLink:  TranStar's feeder airline
In 1986, prior to TranStar being shut down, a commuter airline feeder service in Texas between Austin (AUS) and Killeen, TX (ILE), Laredo, TX (LRD) and San Angelo, TX (SJT), and also between Houston Hobby Airport (HOU) and Brownsville, TX (BRO), College Station, TX (CLL), Killeen, TX (ILE) and Victoria, TX (VCT) was established and briefly undertaken under the name and guise of "TranStar Skylink".  By early 1987, additional TranStar SkyLink service nonstop between Houston Hobby Airport and Beaumont, TX/Port Arthur, TX (BPT) was being operated with ten roundtrip flights every weekday in addition to flights serving southern Louisiana with a routing of Houston Hobby (HOU) - Lake Charles, LA (LCH) - Lafayette, LA (LFT) - New Orleans (MSY) being flown with seven roundtrip flights being operated every weekday between HOU and MSY.  All of these services were operated by Rio Airways via a code sharing agreement on behalf of TranStar primarily with Beechcraft 1900C commuter propjets. However, none of the commuter turboprop aircraft operated by Rio Airways on the "Skylink" service were ever painted with TranStar's branding as was indicated in some print advertising.  Connections between TranStar Skylink turboprop flights and  TranStar jet services were available in Austin, Houston Hobby Airport and New Orleans.

Muse Air destinations in 1982

According to the September 15, 1982 Muse Air route map, the airline was serving the following destinations by the fall of that year:

 Houston, Texas - Hobby Airport (HOU) 
 Dallas, Texas - Love Field (DAL)
 Los Angeles, California - Los Angeles International Airport (LAX)
 Midland, Texas/Odessa, Texas (MAF)
 Tulsa, Oklahoma (TUL)

Muse Air destinations in 1985
According to its July 20, 1985 route map, the following destinations were being served by Muse Air shortly after its acquisition by Southwest Airlines:

 Austin, Texas (AUS)
 Brownsville, Texas (BRO)
 Dallas, Texas - Love Field (DAL)
 Houston, Texas - Hobby Airport (HOU) - Hub
 Las Vegas, Nevada (LAS)
 Los Angeles, California - Los Angeles International Airport (LAX)
 McAllen, Texas (MFE)
 Midland/Odessa, Texas (MAF)
 New Orleans, Louisiana (MSY) - Focus city
 Orlando, Florida (MCO)
 San Antonio, Texas (SAT)
 San Jose, California (SJC)
 Tampa, Florida (TPA)
 Tulsa, Oklahoma (TUL)

Muse Air also previously served Lubbock, Texas (LBB) in 1983, Ontario, California (ONT) in 1984, Oklahoma City, Oklahoma (OKC) in 1985 and San Diego, California (SAN) in 1987.

TranStar destinations in 1987
According to its June 15, 1987 route map, the following destinations were being served by TranStar shortly before the airline was shut down:

 Austin, Texas (AUS) - Focus city
 Brownsville, Texas (BRO)
 Dallas, Texas - Love Field (DAL)
 Houston, Texas - Hobby Airport (HOU) - Hub
 Las Vegas, Nevada (LAS)
 Los Angeles, California - Los Angeles International Airport (LAX)
 Miami, Florida (MIA)
 New Orleans, Louisiana (MSY) - Focus city
 Orlando, Florida (MCO)
 San Antonio, Texas (SAT)
 San Diego, California (SAN)
 San Francisco, California (SFO)
 Tampa, Florida (TPA)

TranStar also previously served McAllen, Texas (MFE) and Midland/Odessa, Texas (MAF) during 1986.

Fleet 
According to the Muse Air historical website, the airline operated the following jet aircraft during its existence as Muse Air and TranStar:

1 - McDonnell Douglas DC-9-30
8 - McDonnell Douglas DC-9-50
2 - McDonnell Douglas MD-81
8 - McDonnell Douglas MD-82
2 - McDonnell Douglas MD-83

The Muse Air historical website also states the airline owned two de Havilland Canada DHC-6 Twin Otter STOL capable turboprop aircraft at one point; however, it appears they were not operated in scheduled service.

See also 
 List of defunct airlines of the United States

References

External links

Muse Air:  A history of an airline

Fleet Information from Air Fleets.net
Timetable images
NY Times article on shutdown
Code and fleet information

Defunct airlines of the United States
Airlines established in 1981
Airlines disestablished in 1987
Companies based in Houston
Defunct companies based in Texas
Southwest Airlines